Piaractus is a genus of large serrasalmid from South America. The two traditionally recognized species of Piaractus are very similar in appearance and were formerly included in the genus Colossoma, which currently only contains another similar species, the tambaqui (Colossoma macropomum). A third Piaractus was described in 2019 as a new species, but it was formerly considered a subpopulation of P. brachypomus.

Species
There are currently three recognized species in this genus:

 Piaractus brachypomus (G. Cuvier, 1818) (Pirapatinga or red-bellied pacu)
 Piaractus mesopotamicus (Holmberg, 1887) (small-scaled pacu or Paraná River pacu)
 Piaractus orinoquensis Escobar et al., 2019

References

Serrasalmidae
Taxa named by Carl H. Eigenmann
Fish of South America
Ray-finned fish genera